Rosewood is an unincorporated community in Harrison County, Indiana, in the United States.

History
A post office was established at Rosewood in 1854, and remained in operation until it was discontinued in 1905.

References

Unincorporated communities in Harrison County, Indiana
Unincorporated communities in Indiana